Rockcliffe is a village and civil parish in the City of Carlisle district of Cumbria, England.  Part of the parish is a marshy peninsula between the mouths of the rivers Esk and Eden.  The parish includes the settlements of Rockcliffe, Rockcliffe Cross, Floristonrigg, Todhills, Low Harker and Harker.

Rockcliffe formerly had a railway station, on the Caledonian Railway Main Line, that closed in 1965. Another station was located nearby at Floriston that closed in 1950.

Place-name meaning
Rockcliffe does not mean 'cliff by rocks' or 'rocky cliff' as many might think. The name means 'red cliff', implying a sandstone cliff-face. The name is from Old Norse rauðr meaning "red" and Old English clif for "cliff", similar to Radcliffe in Greater Manchester.

Governance
Rockcliffe is the largest parish in the electoral ward of Longtown & Rockcliffe. The ward covers the two parishes and the area in between. The total ward population at the 2011 Census was 4,123.

See also

Listed buildings in Rockcliffe, Cumbria

References

External links
 Cumbria County History Trust: Rockcliffe (nb: provisional research only – see Talk page)

 
Villages in Cumbria
Civil parishes in Cumbria
City of Carlisle